DCOS may refer to:
  List of Disney Channel series#Disney Channel original series.
 Datacenter Operating System, an open source operating system and distributed system.